Grassing is one of the oldest methods of bleaching textile goods. The grassing method has been long been used in Europe to bleach linen and cotton based fabrics.

Method 
The linens were laid out on the grass for over seven days after boiling with the ''lyes of ashes and rinsing''. The atmospheric oxygen and the oxygen left by the grass provide the whitening action. The cloth becomes whiter day by day until it attains the full whiteness. It was a slow process, but safer for the subjected material. Chemical bleaching may harm the cloth , but in the grassing it hardly affects the cloth's strength.

Bleachfield 
The Bleachfield was an open area to spread cloth. It was a field near the watercourse used by a bleachery. Bleachfields were common in and around the mill towns during the British Industrial Revolution

Chemical bleaching 
With the discovery of Chlorine in the late 18th century, chemical bleaching took over from grassin, as it was quicker and could be done in indoors.

Oxygen bleaching action 
It is the conjugated double bonds of the substrate that makes the substrate capable of absorbing visible light. The absorption of light makes the cloth look yellowish. Bleaching with oxygen removes the chromophoric sites and makes the cloths whiter. Oxygen is a degrading bleaching agent. Its bleaching action is based on ''destroying the phenolic groups and the carbon–carbon double bonds.''. A major source of chemical bleaching is hydrogen peroxide that contains  a single bond, (–O–O–). When the bond breaks, it gives rise to very reactive oxygen specie, which is the active agent of the bleach. Around sixty percent of the world's hydrogen peroxide  is used in chemical bleaching of textiles and wood pulp.

Gallery

See also
 Timeline of clothing and textiles technology
 Scouring (textiles)

References 

History of the textile industry
Textile arts
Textile techniques
Textile chemistry